Artic or ARTIC  may refer to:

Places
Artic, Indiana, an unincorporated community
Artic, Washington, an unincorporated community

Transportation
 Anaheim Regional Transportation Intermodal Center, a transit hub in Anaheim, California
 Articulated lorry, a common term for a semi-trailer truck
 Volvo Gran Artic 300, a proposed bi-articulated bus chassis manufactured by Volvo
 Škoda Artic, an articulated low-floor Transportation tram manufactured by Škoda Transtech Oy

Other uses
 Art Institute of Chicago
 Artic Computing, a defunct video game developer

See also

 
 Artik (disambiguation)
 Arctic (disambiguation)